Jaane Kya Hoga Rama Re was an Indian drama television series, which premiered on November 16, 2015, and is broadcast on Life OK. The series is produced by Shobhana Desai Productions. The shows airs on Monday to Friday at 8:00 PM and later at 7:30 PM on Life Ok.

Jatin Sharma, Vinti Idnani, and Supriya Pathak have been finalized to play the lead roles respectively in the series. Deepak Dutta will portray the character of a typical drunkard with a good heart, while Supriya Pathak will play the role of a powerful woman.

Cast
Jatin Sharma as Raju Kaushik
Vinti Idnani as Nandini "Nandu" Kar
Fahad Ali as Shekhar "Sunny" Talwar
Deepak Dutta as Dev Kaushik
Supriya Pathak as Rambhateri
Mihir Mishra as Mr. Rawal
Paras Singh Minhas as Pratap
Varsha Usgaonkar as Indu Talwar
Anjali Gupta as Garima
Aishwarya Khare as Rashmi

External links 
Official website

References

2015 Indian television series debuts
Hindi-language television shows
Television shows set in Mumbai
Indian drama television series
Indian television soap operas
Life OK original programming